Tom Eeckhout (born 25 November 1989), known professionally as Tom Dice, is a Belgian singer-songwriter. He finished runner-up in the Flemish version of The X Factor in 2008 using his birth name Tom Eeckhout, but soon after changed his name taking the stage name Tom Dice.

He represented Belgium in the Eurovision Song Contest 2010 final on 29 May in Oslo with "Me and My Guitar" ending up sixth overall. Dice was also the first Belgian act to qualify for the final since the introduction of the semi-finals in Eurovision. It became an international hit for Dice. Tom Dice has released three studio albums, Teardrops in 2010, Heart for Sale in 2012, and I've Come a Long Way in 2016.

Early life
Dice learned to play the guitar as a child, began songwriting in his early teens and at the age of 15 joined band The Dice, using Tom Eeckhout Dice as his stage name.

Career

2008–09: Breakthrough
In 2008 he entered the Flemish X Factor and, with Maurice Engelen as his vocal coach, finished runner-up to Dirk De Smet.

Following X Factor, Dice became the first signing to new label SonicAngel, and in June 2009, now under the name of Tom Dice, released his first single, an acoustic cover of Leona Lewis' Bleeding Love. The single went on to reach number 7 on the Flemish singles chart during a 14-week chart run. Dice received a nomination in the 2009 TMF Awards in the category "Best New Artist", losing out to Jasper Erkens.

In May 2009, Dice began working, again with Engelen, on his debut album, which was originally scheduled for an October 2009 release, but was delayed until April 2010.

2009–11: Eurovision Song Contest and Teardrops

On 25 November 2009, Dice was chosen by the Flemish broadcaster Vlaamse Radio- en Televisieomroep (VRT) to represent Belgium at the Eurovision Song Contest 2010 in Oslo, Norway. His distinctive voice and TV experience were cited among the factors behind his selection. Reaction in Belgium to the announcement that Dice had been chosen by internal means was mixed, with some feeling that an open and public selection involving different artists would have been preferable.

The chosen song "Me and My Guitar" was unveiled on 7 March 2010, and was co-written by Ashley Hicklin, Jeroen Swinnen and Dice himself. The song went to number 1 in Belgium, both on the iTunes chart and on the official Flemish and Walloon charts; it also reached number 7 in Luxembourg. Dice performed the song in the first semi-final in Oslo on 25 May 2010 and qualified for the final, in first place, making him the first Belgian act to do so in 6 years. Tom Dice finished in sixth place, one of Belgium's best placements in the contest.

In April 2010, Dice released his debut studio album Teardrops, it peaked at number 1 in Belgium. In August 2010, he released the single "Lucy" as the third single from the album. In November 2010, he released the single "A Thousand Years" as the fourth single from the album. In March 2011, Dice served as Taylor Swift's opening act for her concerts in Belgium and the Netherlands. In May 2011, he appeared on Elisa Tovati's single "Il nous faut", which features on her album Le syndrome de Peter Pan

2012–13: Heart for Sale

In February 2012, Dice released the single "Utopia" as the lead single from his second studio album. In May 2012, he released his second studio album Heart for Sale, it peaked at number 11 in Belgium, he also released "Out At Sea" as the second single from the album. In October 2012, he released "Drive Me to Paris" as the third single from the album. In April 2013 he released "Let Me In" as the fourth single from the album.

2016–2019: I've Come a Long Way

On 29 January 2016, Dice released the single "Right Between the Eyes" as the lead single from his third studio album. On 16 September 2016, he released the single "Hey There Sister" as the second single from his third studio album. on 28 October 2016, he released his third studio album I've Come a Long Way, it peaked at number 39 in Belgium.

2019-present: The Starlings
In 2019, Dice teamed up with his wife, the Belgian singer Kato Callebaut, to form a pop duo called The Starlings. Since 2019, they have issued singles such as "On My Way", "Just Come Home""Die Happy" and "Gold", while an album called Seaside was issued in 2022.

Discography

Albums

Singles

As lead artist

As featured artist

Notes

References

External links

Official website (Dutch)
Recordlabel SonicAngel
The Dice Myspace page

1989 births
21st-century Belgian male singers
21st-century Belgian singers
Eurovision Song Contest entrants for Belgium
Belgian pop singers
Eurovision Song Contest entrants of 2010
Living people
People from East Flanders
The X Factor contestants